Flower Buds is a 2011 Czech drama film written and directed by Zdeněk Jiráský.

Cast

 Vladimír Javorský as Jarda
 Malgorzata Pikus as Kamila
 Marika Šoposká as Agáta
 Miroslav Pánek as Honza
 Natalie Řehořová as Magda
 Aneta Krejčíková as Zuzana

References

External links
 

2011 films
2011 drama films
2010s Czech-language films
Czech Lion Awards winners (films)
Czech Film Critics' Awards winners
Czech drama films